Fluttering Hearts is a 1927 American film featuring Charley Chase, Oliver Hardy, and Eugene Pallette.

Cast
 Charley Chase as Charley
 Martha Sleeper as Daughter
 Oliver Hardy as Big Bill
 William Burress as Father
 Eugene Pallette as Motorcycle Cop
 Kay Deslys as Big Bill's girl
 May Wallace - Mother
 Charlie Hall as Man under car
John Gavin

External links

1927 films
1927 short films
American silent short films
American black-and-white films
1927 comedy films
Films directed by James Parrott
Silent American comedy films
Films with screenplays by H. M. Walker
American comedy short films
1920s American films